Aeridostachya vulcanica is a species of plant within the orchid family. It is native to Sulawesi.

References

vulcanica
Flora of Sulawesi